African immigration to Canada comprises citizens of countries in Africa who emigrated to Canada, as well as their descendants.

According to Statistics Canada, African-born individuals comprised 13.4% of recent immigrants to Canada as of 2016. This was the second largest number of recent immigrants to the nation after Europe, and a four-fold increase from the number of African-born immigrants in 1971 (3.2%). As of 2016, the top five countries of birth of recent African-born immigrants to Canada were Nigeria, Algeria, Egypt, Morocco and Cameroon.

Among the population in Canada with an immigrant background, persons with ancestry from Africa were the youngest residents as of 2016, with the largest proportion aged between 0-14 years old (~12%).

Many immigrants from French-speaking African countries have settled in Quebec. Of these, most were from Côte d'Ivoire, Congo-Kinshasa and Senegal, as well as Algeria, Morocco and Tunisia.

See also

 Black Canadians
 Emigration from Africa
 African immigration to the United States

References

Immig
Canada
Ethnic groups in Canada
Immigration to Canada
African